In 1991 the Shakespeare Theatre Company, under Artistic Director Michael Kahn, initiated its annual Free For All performances in Washington, D.C.’s Rock Creek Park. Each year the Company performs a show free to the public, usually from a previous season. In 2009 the Free For All was moved indoors to Sidney Harman Hall, one of two theatres operated by the Shakespeare Theatre Company in downtown D.C. This more accessible location allows the Shakespeare Theatre Company to perform rain or shine, offer matinees, maintain the artistic excellence of the production and increase the overall number of Free For All performances.

The first Free For All production in 1991 was The Merry Wives of Windsor, starring Paul Winfield as Falstaff. More recent shows have included Much Ado about Nothing, A Midsummer Night’s Dream and Pericles. A Midsummer Night’s Dream, the Free For All production for 2005, traveled to the Aspen Institute’s Ideas Festival in Colorado that same summer.

The Shakespeare Theatre Company received The Washington Post Award for Distinguished Community Service in 1992 and the 1997 Public Humanities Award from the Humanities Council of Washington D.C. for the Free For All.

Free For All productions
Summer 2019: Hamlet
Summer 2018: Romeo and Juliet
Summer 2017: Othello
Summer 2016: The Tempest
Summer 2015: A Midsummer Night’s Dream
Summer 2014: The Winter’s Tale
Summer 2013: Much Ado About Nothing
Summer 2012: All's Well That Ends Well
Summer 2011: Julius Caesar
Summer 2010: Twelfth Night
Summer 2009: The Taming of the Shrew
Summer 2008: Hamlet
Summer 2007: Love's Labour's Lost
Summer 2006: Pericles
Summer 2005: A Midsummer Night's Dream
Summer 2004: Much Ado about Nothing
Summer 2003: Hamlet
Summer 2002: The Two Gentlemen of Verona
Summer 2001: King Lear
Summer 2000: The Merchant of Venice
Summer 1999: The Merry Wives of Windsor
Summer 1998: All's Well That Ends Well
Summer 1997: Henry V
Summer 1996: Measure for Measure
Summer 1995: Twelfth Night
Summer 1994: The Comedy of Errors
Summer 1993: Much Ado about Nothing
Summer 1992: As You Like It
Summer 1991: The Merry Wives of Windsor

See also

 Shakespeare Theatre Company
 Michael Kahn (theatre director)

References

External links
Shakespeare Theatre Company Official Website

Shakespeare festivals in the United States
Summer festivals
Festivals in Washington, D.C.